The Years of Lead is a term used for a period of social turmoil and political violence in Italy that lasted from the late 1960s until the late 1980s, marked by a wave of both far-left and far-right incidents of political terrorism.

The Years of Lead are often considered to have begun with the 1968 movement in Italy and the Hot Autumn strikes starting in 1969; the death of the policeman Antonio Annarumma in November 1969; the Piazza Fontana bombing in December of that year, which killed 17 and was perpetrated by right-wing terrorists in Milan; and the subsequent death that same month of anarchist, left-wing worker Giuseppe Pinelli while in police custody under suspicion of a crime he did not commit.

A far-left group, the Red Brigades, eventually became the most notorious terrorist organization associated with the period; in 1978, they kidnapped and assassinated former prime minister Aldo Moro. Another major crime associated with the Italian Years of Lead was the 1980 bombing of the Bologna railway station, which killed 85 people and was perpetrated by the far-right, neo-fascist terrorist group known as the Nuclei Armati Rivoluzionari. The terrorist organizations were gradually disbanded and their members arrested throughout the 1980s, with sporadic political violence continuing in Italy until the late 1980s and resurfacing to a lesser extent in the late 1990s until the mid-2000s.

Origin of the name
The term's origin possibly came as a reference to the number of shootings during the period, or a popular 1981 German film Marianne and Juliane, released in Italy as Anni di piombo, which centered on the lives of two members of the West German militant far-left group Red Army Faction which had gained notoriety during the same period.

Background 

There was widespread social conflict and unprecedented acts of terrorism carried out by both right- and left-wing groups. An attempt to endorse the neo-fascist Italian Social Movement (MSI) by the Tambroni Cabinet led to rioting and was short-lived. Widespread labor unrest and the collaboration of countercultural student activist groups with working class factory workers and pro-labor radical leftist organizations such as Potere Operaio and Lotta Continua culminated in the so-called "Hot Autumn" of 1969, a massive series of strikes in factories and industrial centres in Northern Italy. Student strikes and labour strikes, often led by workers, leftists, left-sympathizing laborers, or Marxist activists, became increasingly common, often deteriorating into clashes between the police and demonstrators composed largely of workers, students, activists, and often left-wing militants.

The Christian Democrats (DC) were instrumental in the Italian Socialist Party (PSI) gaining power in the 1960s and they created a coalition. The assassination of the Christian Democrat leader Aldo Moro in 1978 ended the strategy of historic compromise between the DC and the Italian Communist Party (PCI). The assassination was carried out by the Red Brigades, then led by Mario Moretti. Between 1968 and 1988, 428 murders were attributed to political violence in the form of bombings, assassinations, and street warfare between rival militant factions.

Participating organizations 

 National Vanguard
 Nuclei Armati Rivoluzionari
 Gruppo XXII Ottobre
 Ordine Nuovo
 Prima Linea
 Red Brigades
 Lotta Continua

Timeline of events

1969

Public protests 

Public protests shook Italy during 1969, with the autonomist student movement being particularly active, leading to the occupation of the Fiat Mirafiori automobile factory in Turin.

Killing of Antonio Annarumma 
On 19 November 1969, Antonio Annarumma, a Milanese policeman, was killed during a riot by far-left demonstrators. He was the first civil servant to die in the wave of violence.

Piazza Fontana bombing 

The Victor Emmanuel II Monument, the Banca Nazionale del Lavoro in Rome and the Banca Commerciale Italiana and the Banca Nazionale dell'Agricoltura in Milan were bombed in December.

Local police arrested 80 or so suspects from left-wing groups, including Giuseppe Pinelli, an anarchist initially blamed for the bombing, and Pietro Valpreda. Their guilt was denied by left-wing members, especially by members of the student movement, then prominent in Milan's universities, as they believed that the bombing was carried out by fascists. Following the death of Giuseppe Pinelli, who mysteriously died on 15 December while in police custody, the radical left-wing newspaper Lotta Continua started a campaign accusing police officer Luigi Calabresi of Pinelli's murder. In 1975, Calabresi and other police officials were acquitted by judge Gerardo D'Ambrosio who decided that Pinelli's fall from a window had been caused by his being taken ill and losing his balance.

Meanwhile, the anarchist Valpreda and five others were convicted and jailed for the bombing. They were later released after three years of preventive detention. Then, two neo-fascists, Franco Freda (resident in Padua) and Giovanni Ventura, were arrested accused of being the organizers of the massacre; in 1987 they were acquitted by the Supreme Court for lack of evidence.

In the 1990s, new investigations into the Piazza Fontana bombing, citing new witnesses testimony, implicated Freda and Ventura again. However, the pair cannot be put on trial again because of double jeopardy, as they were acquitted of the crime in 1987.

The Red Brigades, the most prominent far-left terrorist organization, conducted a secret internal investigation that paralleled the official inquiry. The inquiry was discovered after a shootout between the Red Brigade and the Carabinieri at Robbiano di Mediglia in October 1974. The cover-up  was exposed in 2000 by Giovanni Pellegrino, at the time President of the Commissione Stragi (Parliamentary Committee on massacres).

1970

Birth of the Red Brigades 
The Red Brigades were founded in August 1970 by Renato Curcio and Margherita (Mara) Cagol, who had met as students at the University of Trento and later married, and Alberto Franceschini.

While the Trento group around Curcio had its main roots in the Sociology Department of the Catholic University, the Reggio Emilia group (around Franceschini) mostly included former members of the FGCI (the Communist youth movement) expelled from the parent party for their extremist views.

Another group of militants came from the Sit-Siemens factories in Milan; these were Mario Moretti, a union official, Corrado Alunni, who would leave the Red Brigades to found another organization "fighter", and Alfredo Buonavita, a blue-collar worker.

The first action of the RB was burning the car of Giuseppe Leoni (a leader of Sit-Siemens company in Milan) on 17 September 1970, in the context of the labour unrest within the factory.

Golpe Borghese attempted coup 
In December, a neo-fascist coup, dubbed the Golpe Borghese, was planned by young far-right fanatics, elderly veterans of Italian Social Republic, and supported by members of the Corpo Forestale dello Stato, along with right-aligned entrepreneurs and industrialists. The "Black Prince", Junio Valerio Borghese, took part in it. The coup, called off at the last moment, was discovered by the newspaper Paese Sera, and publicly exposed three months later.

1971

Assassination of Alessandro Floris 
On March 26, Alessandro Floris was assassinated in Genoa by a unit of the October 22 Group, a far-left terrorist organization. An amateur photographer had taken a photo of the killer that enabled police to identify the terrorists. The group was investigated, and more members arrested. Some fled to Milan and joined the Gruppi di Azione Partigiana (GAP) and, later, the Red Brigades.

The Red Brigades considered Gruppo XXII Ottobre its predecessor and, in April 1974, they kidnapped Judge Mario Sossi in a failed attempt at freeing the jailed members. Years later, the Red Brigades killed judge Francesco Coco on June 8, 1976, along with his two police escorts, Giovanni Saponara and Antioco Deiana, in revenge.

1972

Assassination of Luigi Calabresi 
On 17 May 1972, police officer Luigi Calabresi, a recipient of the gold medal of the Italian Republic for civil valour, was killed in Milan. Authorities initially focused on suspects in Lotta Continua; then it was assumed that Calabresi had been killed by neo-fascist organizations, bringing about the arrest of two neo-fascist activists, Gianni Nardi and Bruno Stefano, along with German Gudrun Kiess, in 1974. They were ultimately released. Sixteen years later, Adriano Sofri, Giorgio Petrostefani, Ovidio Bompressi, and Leonardo Marino were arrested in Milan following Marino's confession to the murder. Their trial finally established their guilt in organising and carrying out the assassination.
Calabresi's assassination opened the chapter of assassinations carried out by armed groups of the far-left.

Peteano bombing 

On 31 May 1972, three Italian Carabinieri were killed in Peteano in a bombing, attributed to Lotta Continua. Officers of the Carabinieri were later indicted and convicted for perverting the course of justice. Judge Casson identified Ordine Nuovo member Vincenzo Vinciguerra as the man who had planted the Peteano bomb.

The neo-fascist terrorist Vinciguerra, arrested in the 1980s for the bombing in Peteano, declared to magistrate Felice Casson that this false flag attack had been intended to force the Italian state to declare a state of emergency and to become more authoritarian. Vinciguerra explained how the SISMI military intelligence agency had protected him, allowing him to escape to Francoist Spain.

Casson's investigation revealed that the right-wing organization Ordine Nuovo had collaborated with the Italian Military Secret Service, SID (Servizio Informazioni Difesa). Together, they had engineered the Peteano attack and then blamed the Red Brigades. He confessed and testified that he had been covered by a network of sympathizers in Italy and abroad who had ensured that he could escape after the attack. "A whole mechanism came into action", Vinciguerra recalled, "that is, the Carabinieri, the Minister of the Interior, the customs services and the military and civilian intelligence services accepted the ideological reasoning behind the attack."

1973

Primavalle fire 

A 16 April 1973 arson attack by members of Potere Operaio on the house of neo-fascist Italian Social Movement (MSI) militant Mario Mattei in Primavalle, Rome, resulted in his two sons, aged 22 and 8, being burned alive.

Milan Police command bombing 

During a 17 May 1973 ceremony honoring Luigi Calabresi, in which the Interior Minister was present, Gianfranco Bertoli, an anarchist, threw a bomb that killed four and injured 45.

In 1975, Bertoli was sentenced to life imprisonment: the Milan Court wrote that he was embroiled in connections with the far-right, that was a SID informant and a confidant of the Police.

In the 1990s it was suspected that Bertoli was a member of Gladio but he denied it in an interview: in the list of 622 Gladio members made public in 1990, his name is missing.

A magistrate investigating the assassination attempt of Mariano Rumor found that Bertoli's files were incomplete. General Gianadelio Maletti, head of the SID from 1971 to 1975, was convicted in absentia in 1990 for obstruction of justice in the Mariano Rumor case.

1974

Piazza della Loggia bombing 

In May 1974, a bomb exploded during an anti-fascist demonstration in Brescia, Lombardy, killing eight and wounding 102. On 16 November 2010, the Court of Brescia acquitted the defendants: Francesco Delfino (a Carabiniere), Carlo Maria Maggi, Pino Rauti, Maurizio Tramonte, and Delfo Zorzi (members of the Ordine Nuovo neo-fascist group). The prosecutor had requested life sentences for Delfino, Maggi, Tramonte, and Zorzi, and acquittal for lack of evidence for Pino Rauti. The four defendants were acquitted again by the appeal court in 2012 but, in 2014, the supreme court ruled that the appeal trial would have to be held again at the appeal court of Milan for Maggi and Tramonte. Delfino and Zorzi were definitively acquitted. On 22 July 2015, the appeal court sentenced Maggi and Tramonte to life imprisonment for ordering and co-ordinating the massacre.

First murder by the Red Brigades 
On 17 June 1974, two members of MSI were murdered in Padua. Initially, an internal feud between neo-fascist groups was suspected, since the crime had occurred in the city of Franco Freda. However, the murder was then claimed by the Red Brigades: it was the first murder of the organization, which, until then had only committed robberies, bombings, and kidnappings.

Planned neo-fascist coup 

Count Edgardo Sogno said in his memoirs that in July 1974, he visited the Central Intelligence Agency (CIA) station chief in Rome to inform him of preparations for a neo-fascist coup. Asking what the United States (US) government would do in case of such a coup, Sogno wrote that he was told, "the United States would have supported any initiative tending to keep the communists out of government."
General Maletti declared, in 2001, that he had not known about Sogno's relationship with the CIA and had not been informed about the coup, known as Golpe bianco (White Coup), led by Randolfo Pacciardi.

Bombing of Italicus train 

On 4 August 1974, 12 people were killed and 48 others injured in the bombing of the Italicus Rome-Brenner express train at San Benedetto Val di Sambro. Responsibility was claimed by the neo-fascist terrorist organization Ordine Nero.

Arrest of Vito Miceli 
General Vito Miceli, chief of the SIOS military intelligence agency in 1969, and head of the SID from 1970 to 1974, was arrested in 1974 on charges of "conspiracy against the state". Following his arrest, the Italian secret services were reorganized by a 24 October 1977 law in an attempt to reassert civilian control over the intelligence agencies. The SID was divided into the current SISMI, the SISDE, and the CESIS, which was to directly coordinate with the Prime Minister of Italy. An Italian Parliamentary Committee on Secret services control (Copaco) was created at the same time. Miceli was acquitted in 1978.

Arrest of Red Brigades leaders 
In 1974, some leaders of the Red Brigades, including Renato Curcio and Alberto Franceschini, were arrested, but new leadership continued the war against the Italian right-wing establishment with increased fervor.

The Italian government showed reluctance in addressing far left terrorism. The ruling Christian Democracy party underestimated the threat of the Red Brigades, speaking of "phantom" Red Brigades, emphasizing instead the danger of neo-fascist groups. The Italian left wing also was less worried by the existence of an armed communist organization than by the possible abuses by the police against protesters, calling for the disarmament of police during street demonstrations.

The year before, Potere Operaio had disbanded, although Autonomia Operaia carried on in its wake. Lotta Continua also dissolved in 1976, although their magazine struggled on for several years. From the remnants of Lotta Continua and similar groups, the terror organization Prima Linea emerged.

1975 
On 28 February, student and fascist activist Mikis Mantakas was killed by far-leftists during riots in Rome.

On 13 March, young militant of Italian Social Movement (MSI) Sergio Ramelli was assaulted in Milan by a group of Avanguardia Operaia and wounded in the head with wrenches (aka Hazet 36). He died on 29 April, after 47 days in the hospital.

On 25 May, student and left activist Alberto Brasili was stabbed in Milan by neo-fascist militants.

On 5 June, Giovanni D'Alfonso, member of the Carabinieri police force, was killed by the Red Brigades.

1976 
On 29 April, lawyer and militant of Italian Social Movement (MSI) Enrico Pedenovi was killed in Milan by the organization Prima Linea. This was the first assassination conducted by Prima Linea.

On 8 July, in Rome, Judge Vittorio Occorsio was killed by neo-fascist Pierluigi Concutelli.

On 14 December, in Rome, policeman Prisco Palumbo was killed by the Nuclei Armati Proletari.

On 15 December, in Sesto San Giovanni (a town near Milan), vice chief Vittorio Padovani and Marshal Sergio Bazzega were killed by young extremist Walter Alasia.

1977 

On 11 March, Francesco Lorusso was killed by the military police (the Carabinieri) in the university of Bologna.

On 12 March, a Turin policeman Giuseppe Ciotta was killed by Prima Linea.

On 22 March, a Rome policeman Claudio Graziosi was killed by Nuclei Armati Proletari.

On 28 April, in Turin, lawyer Fulvio Croce was killed by the Red Brigades.

On 12 May, in Rome, 19-year-old student Giorgiana Masi was killed during clashes between police officers and demonstrators.

On 14 May, in Milan, activists from a far-left organization pulled out their pistols and began to shoot at the police, killing policeman Antonio Custra. A photographer took a photo of an activist shooting at the police. This year was called the time of the "P38", referring to the Walther P38 pistol.

On 16 November, in Turin, Carlo Casalegno, deputy director of the newspaper La Stampa, was seriously wounded in an ambush of the Red Brigades. He died thirteen days later, on November 29.

1978 
On 4 January, in Cassino, Fiat boss security services Carmine De Rosa was killed by leftists.

On 7 January, in Rome young militants of Italian Social Movement (MSI) Franco Bigonzetti and Francesco Ciavatta were killed by far-leftists, another militant (Stefano Recchioni) was killed by the police during a violent demonstration. Some militants left the MSI and founded the Nuclei Armati Rivoluzionari, which had ties with the Roman criminal organization Banda della Magliana.

On 20 January, in Florence, policeman Fausto Dionisi was killed by Prima Linea.

On 7 February, in Prato (a town near Florence), notary Gianfranco Spighi was killed by leftists.

On 14 February, in Rome, Judge Riccardo Palma was killed by the Red Brigades.

On 10 March, in Turin, Marshal Rosario Berardi was killed by the Red Brigades.

On 16 March in Milan, the killing of Fausto and Iaio occurred. Nobody has ever been found responsible for the double murder.

On 11 April, in Turin, policeman Lorenzo Cutugno was killed by the Red Brigades.

On 20 April, in Milan, policeman Francesco Di Cataldo was killed by the Red Brigades.

On 10 October, in Rome, judge Girolamo Tartaglione was killed by the Red Brigades.

On 11 October, in Naples, university teacher Alfredo Paolella was killed by Prima Linea.

On 8 November, in Patrica (a town near Frosinone), judge Fedele Calvosa was killed by the Unità Comuniste Combattenti.

Kidnapping and assassination of Aldo Moro 

On March 16, 1978, Aldo Moro was kidnapped by the Red Brigades (then led by Mario Moretti) and five of his security detail were killed. Aldo Moro was a left-leaning Christian Democrat who served several times as prime minister; before his murder, he had been trying to include the Italian Communist Party (PCI), headed by Enrico Berlinguer, in the government through a deal called the Historic Compromise. PCI was, at the time, the largest communist party in western Europe; was mainly because of its non-extremist and pragmatic stance, its growing independence from Moscow and its eurocommunist doctrine. The PCI was especially strong in areas such as Emilia Romagna, where it had stable government positions and mature practical experience, which may have contributed to a more pragmatic approach to politics. The Red Brigades were fiercely opposed by the Communist Party and trade unions: some left-wing politicians used the expression "comrades who do wrong" (Compagni che sbagliano). , one of RB's members who participated at the kidnapping, declared that the decision to kidnap Moro "was taken a week before, a day was decided, it could have been March 15 or 17".

The corpse was found that same day in the trunk of a red Renault 4 in via Michelangelo Caetani, in downtown Rome. A consequence there was the fact that the PCI did not gain executive power.

Moro's assassination was followed by a large clampdown on the social movement, including the arrest of many members of Autonomia Operaia, including, Oreste Scalzone and political philosopher Antonio Negri (arrested on 7 April 1979).

1979 
Active armed organization grew from 2 in 1969 to 91 in 1977 and 269 in 1979. In that year there were 659 attacks.

Most yearly assassinations 
On 19 January, Turin policeman Giuseppe Lorusso was killed by the Prima Linea organization.

On 24 January, worker and trade unionist Guido Rossa was killed in Genoa by the Red Brigades.

On 29 January, Judge Emilio Alesandrini was killed in Milan by Prima Linea.

On 9 March, university student Emanuele Iurilli was killed in Turin by Prima Linea.

On 20 March, investigative journalist Mino Pecorelli was gunned down in his car in Rome. Prime Minister Giulio Andreotti and Mafia boss Gaetano Badalamenti were sentenced in 2002 to 24 years in prison for the murder, though the sentences were overturned the following year.

On 3 May, in Rome, policemen Antonio Mea and Piero Ollanu were killed by the Red Brigades.

On 13 July, in Druento (a town near Turin), policeman Bartolomeo Mana was killed by Prima Linea.

On 13 July, in Rome, Lieutenant Colonel of Carabinieri Antonio Varisco was killed by the Red Brigades.

On 18 July, barman Carmine Civitate was killed in Turin, by Prima Linea.

On 21 September, Carlo Ghiglieno was killed in Turin by a group of Prima Linea.

On 11 December, five teachers and five students of the "Valletta" Institute in Turin were shot in the legs by Prima Linea.

1980

More assassinations 
On 8 January, Milan policemen Antonio Cestari, Rocco Santoro, and Michele Tatulli were killed by the Red Brigades.

On 25 January, Genoa policemen Emanuele Tuttobene and Antonio Casu were killed by the Red Brigades.

On 29 January, petrochemical plant manager Silvio Gori was killed by the Red Brigades.

On 5 February, in Monza, Paolo Paoletti was killed by Prima Linea.

On 7 February, Prima Linea militant William Vaccher was killed on suspicion of treason.

On 12 February, in Rome, at the "La Sapienza" University, Vittorio Bachelet, vice-president of the High Council of the Judiciary and former president of the Roman Catholic association Azione Cattolica, was killed by the Red Brigades.

On 10 March, in Rome, cook Luigi Allegretti was killed by Compagni armati per il Comunismo.

On 16 March, in Salerno, Judge Nicola Giacumbi was killed by the Red Brigades.

On 18 March, in Rome, Judge Girolamo Minervini was killed by the Red Brigades.

On 19 March, in Milan, Judge Guido Galli was killed by a group of Prima Linea.

On 10 April, in Turin, Giuseppe Pisciuneri a Mondialpol guard, was killed by Ronde Proletarie.

On 28 May, in Milan, journalist Walter Tobagi was killed by Brigata XXVIII marzo.

On 23 June, in Rome, Judge Mario Amato was killed by the Nuclei Armati Rivoluzionari.

On 31 December, in Rome, General of Carabinieri Enrico Galvaligi was killed by the Red Brigades.

Bologna massacre 

On 2 August, a bomb killed 85 people and wounded more than 200 in Bologna. Known as the Bologna massacre, the blast destroyed a large portion of the city's railway station. This was found to be a neo-fascist bombing, mainly organized by the Nuclei Armati Rivoluzionari: Francesca Mambro and Valerio Fioravanti were sentenced to life imprisonment. In April 2007 the Supreme Court confirmed the conviction of Luigi Ciavardini, a NAR member associated closely with close ties to Terza Posizione. Ciavardini received a 30-year prison sentence for his role in the attack.

1981
On 5 July, Giuseppe Taliercio, director of the Porto Marghera's Montedison petrochemical establishment, was killed by the Red Brigades after 47 days of kidnapping.

On 3 August, Roberto Peci, an electrician, was killed by the Red Brigades after being kidnapped and held for 54 days. The killing was a vendetta against his brother Patrizio, a member of RB who became pentito the year before.

On 17 December, James L. Dozier, an American general and the deputy commander of NATO's South European forces based in Verona, was kidnapped by Red Brigades. He was freed in Padua on 28 January 1982 by the Nucleo Operativo Centrale di Sicurezza (NOCS), an Italian police anti-terrorist task force.

1982 
On 26 August, a group of Red Brigades terrorists attacked a military troop convoy, in Salerno. In the attack, Corporal Antonio Palumbo and policemen Antonio Bandiera and Mario De Marco were killed. The terrorists escaped.

On 21 October, a group of Red Brigades terrorists attacked a bank in Turin, killing two guards, Antonio Pedio and Sebastiano d'Alleo.

1984 
On 15 February, Leamon Hunt, American diplomat and Director General of the international peacekeeping force, Multinational Force and Observers (MFO), was killed by the Red Brigades.

Christmas massacre 

On 23 December, a bomb in a train between Florence and Rome killed 16 and wounded more than 200. In 1992, Mafia's members Giuseppe Calò and Guido Cercola were sentenced to life imprisonment, Franco Di Agostino (another member of the Sicilian Mafia) got 24 years, and German engineer Friedrich Schaudinn 22 for the bombing. Camorra's member Giuseppe Misso was sentenced to 3 years; other members of Camorra, Alfonso Galeota and Giulio Pirozzi were sentenced to 18 months, and their role in the massacre was deemed marginal. On February 18, 1994, the Florence court absolved MSI member of Parliament Massimo Abbatangelo from the massacre charge, but ruled him guilty of giving the explosive to Misso in the spring of 1984. Abbatangelo was sentenced to 6 years. Victims' relatives asked for a tougher sentence, but lost the appeal and had to pay for judiciary expenses.

1985 
On 9 January, in Torvaianica (a town near Rome), policeman Ottavio Conte was killed by the Red Brigades.

On 27 March, in Rome, economist Ezio Tarantelli was killed by the Red Brigades.

1986 
On 10 February 1986, Lando Conti, former Mayor of Florence, was killed by the Red Brigades.

1987 
On 20 March 1987, Licio Giorgieri, a general in the Italian Air Force, was assassinated by the Red Brigades in Rome.

1988 
On 16 April 1988, Senator Roberto Ruffilli was assassinated in an attack by a group of the Red Brigades in Forlì. It was the last murder committed by the Red Brigades: on 23 October a group of irriducibili (hardliners) declared, in a document, that war against the State was over.

Events after 1988

Resurgence in the 1990s and 2000s
In the late 1990s and early 2000s, a resurgence of Red Brigades terrorism led to further assassinations.

On 20 May 1999, Massimo D'Antona, consultant to the Ministry of Labour, was assassinated in an attack by a group of terrorists of the Red Brigades in Rome.

On 19 March 2002, Marco Biagi, consultant to the Ministry of Labour, was assassinated in an attack by a group of terrorists of the Red Brigades in Bologna.

On 2 March 2003, Emanuele Petri, a policeman, was assassinated by a group of Red Brigades terrorists near Castiglion Fiorentino.

In 2005, some suspected terrorists, known as the New Red Brigades (Nuove Brigate Rosse) were arrested. On June 13, the court of Milan condemned 14 terrorists. The leader was sentenced to 15 years in jail. Three suspected terrorists were found not guilty.

2021 arrests
In 2021, France arrested seven of the dozens of fugitive leftist militants which had been given French protection for decades. Among the arrested were Giorgio Pietrostefani, a founding member of the Lotta Continua group who was convicted of the murder of Milan police commissioner Luigi Calabresi. Others were Marina Petrella, Roberta Cappelli and Sergio Tornaghi who had received life sentences for murders and kidnappings.

Countries that granted participants asylum

France 
The Mitterrand doctrine, which was established in 1985 by then socialist French president François Mitterrand, stated that Italian far-left terrorists who fled to France and who were convicted of violent acts in Italy, excluding "active, actual, bloody terrorism" during the "Years of Lead", would receive asylum and would not be subject to extradition to Italy. They would be integrated into French society.

The act was announced on 21 April 1985, at the 65th Congress of the Human Rights League (Ligue des droits de l'homme, LDH), stating of Italian criminals who had given up their violent pasts and had fled to France would be protected from extradition to Italy:

According to Reuters, the Italian guerillas numbered in the dozens. The French decision had a long term negative effect on French-Italian relations.

French justice minister Eric Dupond-Moretti said he was

Brazil 
Some Italian citizens accused of terrorist acts have found refuge in Brazil such as Cesare Battisti and others former members of the Armed Proletarians for Communism, a far-left militant and terrorist organization.

Nicaragua 
Some Italian far-left activists found political asylum in Nicaragua, including Alessio Casimirri, who took part in the kidnapping of Aldo Moro.

Impact on emigration from Italy 
The Years of Lead were believed to have increased the rate of immigration to the United States from Italy. However, as the Years of Lead came to an end in the 1980s and political stability increased in Italy, the rate of immigration to the United States decreased. In the years 1992–2002, Italian immigration ranged near 2,500 people annually.

See also 
 Armed, far-right organizations in Italy
 1968 movement in Italy
 Definitions of terrorism
 Guido Rossa
 History of the Italian Republic
 Movement of 1977
 La notte della Repubblica (TV programme)
 Operation Gladio
 Political violence in Turkey (1976–80)
 The Troubles (Ireland)
 Poliziotteschi

Notes

References

Bibliography 
 Coco, Vittorio. "Conspiracy Theories in Republican Italy: The Pellegrino Report to the Parliamentary Commission on Terrorism." Journal of Modern Italian Studies 20.3 (2015): 361–376.
 Diazzi, Alessandra,  and Alvise Sforza Tarabochia, eds. The Years of Alienation in Italy: Factory and Asylum Between the Economic Miracle and the Years of Lead (2019)
 Drake, Richard. "Italy in the 1960s: A Legacy of Terrorism and Liberation." South central review 16 (1999): 62–76. online
 
 King, Amy. "Antagonistic martyrdom: memory of the 1973 Rogo di Primavalle." Modern Italy 25.1 (2020): 33–48.

In Italian

External links

 

 
History of the Italian Republic
Communist terrorism
Neo-fascist terrorism
Proxy wars
1970s in Italy
1980s in Italy